HeadCrash was a German-American alternative metal band formed in 1992. They were signed to the major labels EastWest Records, Discovery Records, and Sony Records, and released four albums in the 1990s. They disbanded in 1999 and reformed in 2001, releasing an album in 2006 followed by a second disbandment that same year. They then briefly reunited from 2014 to 2017. Due to the band utilizing two vocalists and multiple instrumentalists (with seven members simultaneously at one point), they were labeled as many different genres, such as rapcore, thrash metal, industrial rock, funk metal, and crossover. The band's lyrics often portrayed societal problems and political issues.

History

Formation, Scapegoat, major label signing, and death of Weber (1989–1993) 
In the late 1980s, the German duo of Ulrich Franke and Fritz Weber had formed various electronica projects under a wide variety of names such as Cybex Factor, Pink Noise, Anaconda, among others. They released the single "God & Evil" in 1989, which created controversy due to an edited explicit image of Pope John Paul II on the single's cover. The duo was sued by the Catholic Church, although it was later thrown out of court. To release the single, Franke and Weber had started their own record label entitled Bit Bites Brain. Around the same time, vocalist Allen Wright (who was an American living in Germany) was the final singer in the punk rock band Wedding Tackle, which disbanded in 1992. That same year, Wright, Franke, and Weber teamed up with guitarist Herwig Meyszner to form HeadCrash. Wright was on lead vocals, Meyszner was on guitars, Weber was on keyboards and programming (which included the drum machine), and Franke was on keyboards and programming (in addition to production).

Initially, HeadCrash was envisioned as a studio project only, with no intentions of playing live. The quartet recorded and released their debut effort, Scapegoat, in 1993. It was released on the prominent electronic label Zoth Ommog. Scapegoat managed to attract industry attention, and HeadCrash was subsequently signed by the major label EastWest Records that same year. The band then commenced recording of their second album throughout the year. During the process, guitarist Roger Ingenthron from the hardcore punk band Spermbirds had assisted HeadCrash in the studio. He was eventually made an official member of the band during the sessions.

Tragedy struck the band in December 1993 when Weber had committed suicide. No note was left behind. His death was later mentioned in the liner notes of HeadCrash's second album along with the passing of Meyszner's father due to lung cancer. Since the album was nearly finished and also the signing to EastWest Records, HeadCrash opted to continue on.

Direction of Correctness, expanded lineup, and Overdose on Tradition (1994–1996) 
When the album, entitled Direction of Correctness, was finished, HeadCrash decided to no longer be a studio-exclusive project; thus, they enlisted second vocalist Shane Cooper and drummer Nico Berthold into the band. Wright had previously met Cooper at Kaiserslautern High School, which housed a U.S. military base within Germany. With approximately 50,000 American residents, the vicinity was the largest community of Americans outside of the United States mainland.

Direction of Correctness was released in March 1994 on EastWest Records. HeadCrash played their very first live show that same month in Germany, despite initially forming nearly two years earlier. "Black Gold" and "Freedom" were released as singles to support the album. The single version of "Freedom" was re-recorded and remixed so that the entire lineup was included on the track. A music video was also produced for the song and it found occasional airplay on MTV's Headbanger's Ball and 120 Minutes; however, the band was dissatisfied with the final outcome as they felt that their vision was lost. During the second half of 1994, Ingenthron had to leave HeadCrash to focus on his other band Spermbirds. As a result, Junior Douglas from the band War Dance had joined the band on tour. HeadCrash's first major tour was as the openers for the hip-hop group Boo-Yaa T.R.I.B.E. throughout Europe. The song "Scapegoat", which originally appeared on the Scapegoat album and then re-recorded for Direction of Correctness, also appeared on the soundtrack to the Italian black comedy film The Day of the Beast in 1995.

Ingenthron rejoined HeadCrash and replaced Douglas after the 1994 tours. Throughout 1995, HeadCrash recorded and then released their third album Overdose on Tradition. While EastWest Records handled the European release, the American release was distributed by Discovery Records. The album gained coverage in various United States publications. It peaked at #32 on The Hard Report Hard Hitters chart, at #17 on The Gavin Report Gavin Rocks chart, at #13 on Hits Rock chart, and at #18 on CMJ New Music Report Metal Top 25 chart. "Safehouse" was released as the lead single from Overdose on Tradition and a music video was produced as well. HeadCrash retained greater control over the video's concept due to the previous problems with the "Freedom" video; however, due to explicit scenes of drug use and self-harm, the video was outright banned by MTV. As the tour for Overdose on Tradition kicked off in late 1995, the band expanded their lineup to seven members as they added Otto Van Alphen on bass. The band mainly toured Europe instead of the United States and played at festivals such as F MusicFest '96, Osterrocknacht 1996, and the Strange Noise Festival in front of 35,000 attendees. They also went on tour with Thumb to support Overdose on Tradition.

In 1996, HeadCrash released Fresh Ingredients on Franke's Bit Bites Brain label. It consisted of remixes, live tracks, and the aforementioned re-recorded version of "Freedom". Special guest remixers included Andreas Rieke and Mark Pistel. That same year, HeadCrash's Cooper, Berthold, and Alphen teamed up with Arts and Decay's Markus Weilemann and Ernst-Ludwig Hesky to form the supergroup Lungbutter. They released one album with Franke as producer, entitled Release, on EastWest Records.

Lifeboat and first disbandment (1997–1999) 
As 1997 begun, both Berthold and Franke departed from HeadCrash. Franke's keyboardist position was not replaced while Berthold was replaced on drums by Matthias Liebetruth. HeadCrash subsequently did not play any live shows throughout the entirety of 1997. Around the same time, HeadCrash's two main labels (EastWest Records and Discovery Records) had internal shifts within their managements. Both labels separately dissolved which meant that many artists on the rosters were dropped.

The band eventually switched labels to Sony Records. HeadCrash then released their fourth album Lifeboat on Sony's Dragnet Records division in 1998. Both "Snake in the Grass" and "Asphalt Ostrich" were released as singles. "Asphalt Ostrich" was used in the film Lost in Space and was included on the European version of the accompanying soundtrack. They toured behind the album by playing shows with bands such as H-Blockx, Lodestar, and Pansy Division. They also appeared at festivals such as the Rock am Ring and the Bizarre Festival, the latter of which was Ingenthron's final show with the band. He was replaced on guitar by Allard Zwemstra. For the 1998 year, HeadCrash won the Best Live Band award by the readers of the German magazine Visions. The band attempted to record a follow-up album titled Pulse throughout the subsequent two years, but in 1999 they disbanded as the members focused on other projects. Seven tracks from the aborted Pulse sessions were released later in 1999 unofficially on the Forge Ahead compilation.

Initial reunion, Cranium, and second disbandment (2001–2006) 

Towards the end of 2001, both Meyszner and Cooper reformed HeadCrash. They were the only two members from the prior lineups to rejoin, and as such the band reverted to only four members as brothers Paul Stone and Justin Stone joined on drums and bass respectively. The reformed lineup released the demo EP 2002 and afterwards, Paul Stone departed from the band and was replaced by Andy Klein. A second demo EP had appeared as well, Peas in a Pod. Four years later, HeadCrash released their fifth album Cranium (stylized as [cranium]) on Rookie Records. Later that same year, the band disbanded for a second time.

Reformation with Wright (2014–2017) 

HeadCrash was revived yet again in 2014, except with Wright rejoining Meyszner and Cooper. Justin Stone also returned on bass while Andreas Lill was added on drums and Andy Kromarek was added as a second guitarist. Their reunion show was in March 2014. They then played various one-off shows and brief tours. In August 2015, HeadCrash released their first new material in nine years, the single "Human", produced by Jacob Hansen. Around the same time, the majority of HeadCrash's back catalog was added onto streaming services such as Spotify and YouTube. In November of that year, the band played their final live show. Two more songs from the "Human" sessions were then released digitally later on in 2017. Another outtake from the same sessions, "Thoughts and Prayers", was shared by the band's official outlets in June 2022.

Other projects 
Between HeadCrash's hiatuses and after their third disbanding, the members all had perused different projects.

Wright, Alphen, and Zwemstra went on to form the rap metal band End of April, releasing two albums in 2003 and 2004 before disbanding. Wright then created Go Down Believing Management, with the Ukrainian band Jinjer as their most successful client. After End of April's disbandment, Alphen became a professional sailor while also commissioning music to various films and shows. Berthold eventually created his own studio in Berlin, Viktoria Studios, and worked as a producer and mixer for artists such as Wizo and Kraftklub. Ingenthron continued with his prior band Spermbirds, followed by a solo project called Roger TV.

Liebetruth ended up in various bands such as Running Wild and Toxic Taste. He later became the drum technician for the German metal band Scorpions. Franke continued to run the label he formed with the deceased Weber, Bit Bites Brain. He also provided production and remixes in the studio for numerous artists. Meyszner became a film producer for other bands, working on documentaries and videos for artists such as Lacuna Coil, Motörhead, Cypress Hill, and Saxon. Cooper wrote and self-published a biography titled Floodgate (under his Nitrous Oxide alias) shortly after HeadCrash's first disbandment. He eventually took a break from the music industry before joining the band Peace Officer in the late 2000s, which was initially formed by Kromarek. He then launched his own solo project, ShanEye, in 2020.

Members 
Past members
 Allen Wright - vocals (1992–1999, 2014–2017)
 Herwig Meyszner - guitars (1992–1999, 2001–2006, 2014–2017)
 Ulrich Franke - keyboards, programming (1992–1997)
 Fritz Weber - drums, programming (1992–1993; died 1993)
 Roger Ingenthron - guitars (1993–1994, 1995–1998)
 Nico Berthold - drums (1994–1997)
 Shane Cooper - vocals (1994–1999, 2001–2006, 2014–2017)
 Junior Douglas - guitars (1994–1995)
 Otto Van Alphen - bass (1995–1999)
 Matthias Liebetruth - drums (1997–1999)
 Allard Zwemstra - guitars (1998–1999)
 Paul Stone - drums (2001–2003)
 Justin Stone - bass (2001–2006, 2014–2017)
 Andy Klein - drums (2003–2006)
 Andreas Lill - drums (2014–2017)
 Andy Kromarek - guitars (2014–2017)

Timeline

Discography 
Studio albums
Scapegoat, 1993 (Zoth Ommog)
Direction of Correctness, 1994 (EastWest Records)
Overdose on Tradition, 1995 (EastWest Records/Discovery Records)
Lifeboat, 1998 (Sony Records/Dragnet Records)
Cranium, 2006 (Rookie Records)

Other releases
Fresh Ingredients, 1996 (Bit Bites Brain); compilation of remixes and live tracks
Pulse, 1999 (Dragnet Records); incomplete album
2002, 2002 (One Good Eye); demo EP
Peas in a Pod, 2002 (One Good Eye); demo EP

Singles
"Black Gold", 1994 (EastWest Records)
"Freedom", 1994 (EastWest Records)
"Safehouse", 1995 (EastWest Records/Discovery Records)
"Asphalt Ostrich", 1998 (Dragnet Records)
"Snake in the Grass", 1998 (Dragnet Records)
"Human", 2015 (Rookie Records)

Videos
"Scapegoat", 1993
"Black Gold", 1994
"Freedom", 1994
"Safehouse", 1995
"Asphalt Ostrich", 1998
"X-Friend", 2002

References 

American industrial metal musical groups
Discovery Records artists
East West Records artists
Funk metal musical groups
German electronic music groups
German heavy metal musical groups
German industrial music groups
German industrial metal musical groups
German industrial rock musical groups
German rock music groups
Musical groups established in 1992
Political music groups
Rap metal musical groups
Rapcore groups
Zoth Ommog Records artists